1945 is an alternate history novel by Michigan economics professor Robert Conroy, an author of alternate history novels, such as 1901 and 1862. It was first published in trade paperback and ebook form by Ballantine Books in May 2007. In the novel's point of divergence, the Kyūjō coup overthrew Japanese Emperor Hirohito and so World War II resumed until 1946.

Plot
In August 1945, following the atomic bombings of Hiroshima and Nagasaki and the Soviet invasion of Manchuria, a battalion of rogue Imperial Japanese Army officers and troops led by Major Kenji Hatanaka seize the Imperial Palace to prevent the surrender of Japan. They persuade the war minister, General Korechika Anami, to join the coup and gain the support from the rest of the Japanese military. Rather than staying loyal to Emperor Hirohito, as in actual history, Anami orders the imprisonment of Hirohito and establishes himself as the de facto dictator of Japan.

Anami's refusal to surrender leads US President Harry Truman to order Army Chief of Staff General George Marshall to launch Operation Downfall, the Allied invasion of Japan. In preparation for the invasion, a third atomic bomb is dropped on Kokura, destroying the city. To deter any further atomic attacks, Anami orders the transfer of Allied POWs to cities of strategic importance, which prompts the United States to suspend the atomic bombing campaign.  The OSS recruit the Japanese American veteran Joe Nomura to head into Nagasaki under the guise of a Japanese officer to investigate the effects of the nuclear blast. Based on in part of his reports of the radiation effects, the US military's intention of using tactical nuclear warheads is abandoned as too dangerous for their own troops.

In Okinawa, General Douglas MacArthur begins the first phase of Operation Downfall, the invasion of Kyushu (codenamed Olympic), followed by an invasion of Honshu (codenamed Coronet) with the ultimate goal of capturing Tokyo. Though initially set back by the typhoon season, Allied forces eventually secure landing on Kyushu on X-Day, despite suffering heavy losses from Japanese guerilla warfare, kamikaze tactics, Kairyu submarines, and Kaiten human torpedoes.

Meanwhile, Nomura aids an American POW, Dennis Chambers, who escaped in the confusion from a Japanese POW camp near Nagasaki. With his aid, Nomura impersonates a Kenpeitai officer and investigates a heavily guarded camp in Nagasaki, unaware that it houses Hirohito.

MacArthur is killed via a kamikaze on the command vessel USS Augusta. General Omar Bradley assumes command of the operation with Matthew Ridgway as his subordinate while a fourth atomic bomb is ordered by General Curtis LeMay on a loose interpretation of standing orders from President Truman to be dropped on the Kanmon Straits, destroying several Japanese divisions. Back in the homefront, civil disorder occurs in the US in response to the news of the sinking of RMS Queen Elizabeth. Meanwhile, the Red Army invades and occupies Japanese Korea in order to aid the Chinese Communist Party against the Kuomintang during the Chinese Civil War.

Nomura learns that Hirohito is held captive in Nagasaki, and when his superiors are made aware, Bradley authorizes Nomura, Chambers, and a squad of US Army Rangers to extract Hirohito, escape Japan, and bring him to an aircraft carrier to meet Truman. Aware of Hirohito's declaration to surrender to the Allies, a countercoup, led by General Homma and Admiral Ozawa, assassinates Anami and accepts the surrender of Japan in January 1946, despite failing to prevent a successful Japanese counter-offensive against Allied positions in Kyushu.

In the aftermath, Operation Downfall had cost an additional 150,000 Allied casualties. Hirohito is reinstated as emperor and Japan's transition to democracy begins. Despite the Kuomintang's defeat and retreat to Taiwan, the Communist Chinese Party and Soviet Union fail to secure a Sino-Soviet alliance. The Soviets abandon the Korean Peninsula, which likely leads to a Korean unification and the prevention of a Korean War.

With the Soviet economy recovering from the previous war and its sphere of influence dwindling in East Asia, the ensuing Cold War between the East and West will most likely be peaceful.

Literary significance and reception
Booklist said that "realistic to the point of gruesomeness, 1945 recalls David Westheimer's classic Death is Lighter than a Feather."  Publishers Weekly said that Conroy explored the carnage of war through various viewpoints with "moving and thought provoking results".

References

2007 American novels
American alternate history novels
American war novels
Novels by Robert Conroy
Novels about World War II alternate histories
Novels set in Japan
Novels set in Tokyo
Novels about the United States Marine Corps
Fiction set in 1945
Fiction set in 1946
Cultural depictions of Douglas MacArthur
Cultural depictions of Hirohito
Cultural depictions of Harry S. Truman